This is a list of rural localities in the Sakha Republic, organized by district. The Sakha (Yakutia) Republic, simply Sakha (Yakutia), is a federal subject of Russia (a republic). It has a population of 958,528 (2010 Census), consisting mainly of ethnic Yakuts and Russians.

Abyysky District 
Rural localities in Abyysky District:

 Abyy
 Druzhina
 Dyosku
 Keng-Kyuyol
 Kuberganya
 Suturuokha
 Syagannakh

Aldansky District 
Rural localities in Aldansky District:

 Bolshoy Nimnyr
 Chagda
 Khatystyr
 Kutana
 Orochen 1-y
 Orochen 2-y
 Ugoyan
 Ulu
 Uoray
 Verkhny Kuranakh
 Verkhnyaya Amga
 Yakokit
 Yakokut
 Yllymakh
 Yefremovo

Allaikhovsky District 
Rural localities in Allaikhovsky District:

 Chkalov
 Nychalakh
 Olenegorsk
 Oyotung
 Russkoye Ustye
 Vorontsovo

Amginsky District 
Rural localities in Amginsky District:

 Abaga
 Altantsy
 Amga
 Betyuntsy
 Bolugur
 Bulun
 Chakyr 2-y
 Chapchylgan
 Emissy
 Mikhaylovka
 Myandigi
 Olom-Kyuyole
 Onnyos
 Pokrovka
 Promkombinat
 Satagay
 Serge-Bes
 Sulgachchy
 Tegyulte
 Uoray

Anabarsky District 
Rural localities in Anabarsky District:

 Ebelyakh
 Saskylakh
 Yuryung-Khaya

Bulunsky District 
Rural localities in Bulunsky District

 Bykovsky
 Chekurovka
 Kazachye
 Kyusyur
 Namy
 Nayba
 Siktyakh
 Sklad
 Taymylyr
 Ust-Olenyok

Churapchinsky District 
Rural localities in Churapchinsky District:

 Arylakh
 Berya, Russia
 Churapcha
 Chyappara
 Diring, Khoptoginsky Rural Okrug
 Diring, Tyolyoysky Rural Okrug
 Dyabyla
 Dyarla
 Khakhyyakh
 Kharbala 1-ya
 Kharbala 2-ya
 Kilyanki
 Kyndal
 Kystyk-Kugda
 Lebiya
 Maralayy
 Myandiye
 Myndagay
 Myryla
 Ogusur
 Tolon, Bakhsytsky Rural Okrug
 Tolon, Chakyrsky Rural Okrug
 Tuora-Kyuyol
 Ulakhan-Ebya
 Ulakhan-Kyuyol
 Uorga
 Usun-Kyuyol
 Vasily-Alasa
 Yuryakh-Kyuyore
 Yuryung-Kyuyol

Eveno-Bytantaysky National District 
Rural localities in Eveno-Bytantaysky National District:

 Aly
 Batagay-Alyta
 Dzhargalakh
 Kustur

Gorny District 
Rural localities in Gorny District:

 Asyma
 Berdigestyakh
 Byas-Kyuyol
 Chekya-Byas
 Dikimdya
 Ebya
 Keptin
 Kharyyalakh
 Kyuyorelyakh
 Magaras
 May
 Orto-Surt
 Tongulakh
 Tysagachchy
 Ulu-Sysy
 Yert

Khangalassky District 
Rural localities within Khangalassky District:

 Bestyakh
 Bestyakhsky Rural Okrug
 Bulgunnyakhtakh
 Chapayevo
 Charang
 Chkalov
 Isit
 Kachikattsy
 Karapatskoye
 Kerdyom
 Kharyyalakh
 Khotochchu
 Kysyl-Yuryuyya
 Kytyl-Dyura
 Nokhoroy
 Nuochakha
 Oktyomtsy
 Oy, Russia
 Sinsk
 Tit-Ary
 Tit-Ebya
 Toyon-Ary
 Tumul
 Tyokhtyur
 Ulakh-An
 Ulakhan-An
 Yedey
 Yelanka

Kobyaysky District 
Rural localities in Kobyaysky District:

 Argas
 Aryktakh
 Arylakh
 Aviaport
 Bagadya
 Batamay
 Byranattalakh
 Chagda
 Kalvitsa
 Khatyryk-Khomo
 Kobyay
 Lyuksyugyun
 Mastakh
 Mastakh 2-y
 Oyun-Unguokhtakh
 Saga
 Sayylyk
 Sebyan-Kyuyol
 Segyan-Kyuyol
 Sitte
 Smorodichny
 Tyaya

Lensky District 
Rural localities in Lensky District:

 Alysardakh
 Batamay
 Bechencha
 Chamcha
 Dorozhny
 Innyaly
 Khamra
 Krestovsky lesouchastok
 Murya
 Natora
 Nyuya
 Nyuya Severnaya
 Orto-Nakhara
 Tolon
 Turukta
 Yaroslavsky

Megino-Kangalassky District  
Rural localities in Megino-Kangalassky District:

 Balyktakh
 Bedemyo
 Bedzhelek
 Byokyo
 Byrama
 Byuteydyakh
 Chyuyya
 Darkylakh
 Kerdyugen
 Khapchagay
 Khaptagay
 Kharba-Atakh
 Khatylyma
 Khocho
 Khomustakh
 Khorobut
 Lomtuka
 Matta
 Mayyality
 Nuoragana
 Pavlovsk
 Petrovka
 Rassoloda
 Soto
 Suola, Meldekhsinsky Rural Okrug
 Suola, Moruksky Rural Okrug
 Symakh
 Tabaga
 Tarat
 Teligi
 Tomtor
 Tumul
 Tyokhtyur
 Tyungyulyu
 Yelechey

Mirninsky District 
Rural localities in Mirninsky District:

 Arylakh
 Berezovka
 Morkoka
 Novy
 Polyarny
 Syuldyukar
 Tas-Yuryakh
 Zarya

Momsky District 
Rural localities in Momsky District:

 Buor-Sysy
 Chumpu-Kytyl
 Khonuu
 Kulun-Yelbyut
 Sasyr
 Sobolokh
 Suon-Tit

Namsky District 
Rural localities in Namsky District:

 Appany
 Bulus
 Byutyay-Yurdya
 Frunze
 Grafsky Bereg
 Kharyyalakh
 Khatas
 Khongor-Biye
 Krest-Kytyl
 Kysyl-Derevnya
 Kysyl-Syr
 Kyureng-At
 Maymaga
 Namtsy
 Nikolskykha 
 Partizan
 Stolby
 Sygynnakh
 Taragay-Byas
 Tumul
 Voiny
 Yergyolyokh
 Ymyyakhtakh
 Yuner-Olokh

Neryungrinsky District 
Rural localities in Neryungrinsky District:

 Bolshoy Khatymi
 Iyengra

Nizhnekolymsky District 
Rural localities in Nizhnekolymsky District:

 Ambarchik
 Andryushkino
 Chukochya
 Dve Viski
 Kolymskoye
 Krestovaya
 Mikhalkino
 Nizhnekolymsk
 Petushki
 Pokhodsk
 Timkino
 Yermolovo

Nyurbinsky District 
Rural localities in Nyurbinsky District:

 Akana
 Antonovka
 Arangastakh
 Bysyttakh
 Chappanda
 Chkalov
 Chukar
 Dikimdya
 Engolzha
 Khaty
 Khatyn-Sysy
 Kirov
 Kyundyade
 Malykay
 Mar
 Neftebaza
 Nyurbachan
 Saltany
 Sayylyk
 Syulya
 Yedey
 Ynakhsyt
 Zharkhan

Olenyoksky District 
Rural localities in Olenyoksky District:

 Eyik
 Kharyyalakh
 Olenyok
 Zhilinda

Olyokminsky District 
Rural localities in Olyokminsky District:

 Abaga tsentralnaya
 Abaga
 Alexeyevka
 Aviaport
 Balagannakh
 Berdinka
 Biryuk
 Byas-Kyuyol
 Chapayevo
 Cherendey
 Daban
 Dapparay
 Delgey
 Dikimdya
 Innyakh
 Kharyyalakh
 Khating-Tumul
 Kholgo
 Khorintsy
 Kiliyer
 Kochegarovo
 Kudu-Byas
 Kudu-Kyuyol
 Kuranda
 Kyachchi
 Kyllakh
 Macha
 Malykan
 Markha
 Mekimdya
 Neftebaza
 Neryuktyayinsk 1-y
 Neryuktyayinsk 2-y
 Olom
 Olyokminsky
 Sanyyakhtakh
 Selivanovo
 Solyanka
 Tas-Anna
 Tegen
 Tinnaya
 Tokko
 Troitsk
 Tyanya
 Tyubya
 Ulakhan-Mungku
 Uolbut
 Uritskoye
 Yunkyur
 Zarechny
 Zaton LORPa
 Zharkhan

Oymyakonsky District 
Rural localities in Oymyakonsky District:

 Aeroport
 Agayakan
 Bereg-Yurdya
 Delyankir
 Khara-Tumul
 Kuranakh-Sala
 Kuydusun
 Kyubeme
 Orto-Balagan
 Oymyakon
 Teryut
 Tomtor
 Yuchyugey

Srednekolymsky District 
Rural localities in Srednekolymsky District:

 Aleko-Kyuyol
 Argakhtakh
 Berezovka
 Ebyakh
 Khatyngnakh
 Lobuya
 Nalimsk
 Oyusardakh
 Roman
 Soyangi
 Suchchino
 Svatay
 Sylgy-Ytar
 Urodan

Suntarsky District 
Rural localities in Suntarsky District:

 Agdary
 Allaga
 Arylakh
 Arylakh
 Bordon 3-y
 Byas-Sheya
 Chayygda
 Elgyan
 Elgyay
 Eyikyar
 Ilimnir
 Kempendyay
 Kharyyalakh
 Khordogoy
 Khoro
 Komsomol
 Krestyakh
 Kuokunu
 Kutana
 Kyukey
 Kyundyae
 Mar-Kyuyol
 Milyake
 Nakhara
 Neryuktyay
 Oyusut
 Sardanga
 Sheya
 Suntar
 Tenkya
 Tolon, Khadansky Rural Okrug
 Tolon, Tolonsky Rural Okrug
 Toybokhoy
 Tumul
 Tuoydakh
 Tyubyay
 Ustye
 Usun-Kyuyol
 Ygyatta

Tattinsky District  
Rural localities in Tattinsky District:

 Borobul
 Bulun
 Cherkyokh
 Chychymakh
 Chymnayi
 Dakky
 Daya-Amgata
 Debdirge
 Khara-Aldan
 Kharbalakh
 Kyyy
 Tomtor
 Tuora-Kyuyol
 Uolba
 Ytyk-Kyuyol

Tomponsky District  
Rural localities in Tomponsky District:

 Aeroport
 Ary-Tolon
 Keskil
 Krest-Khaldzhay
 Kyulyunken
 Megino-Aldan
 Novy
 Okhotsky-Perevoz
 Razvilka
 Saydy
 Topolinoye
 Tyoply Klyuch
 Udarnik

Ust-Aldansky District  
Rural localities in Ust-Aldansky District:

 Ary-Tit
 Arylakh
 Balagannakh
 Balyktakh
 Beydinga
 Borogontsy
 Byadi
 Byariye
 Charang
 Cheriktey
 Chiryapchi
 Daly
 Dygdal
 Dyupsya
 Elyasin
 Eselyakh
 Kepteni
 Khomustakh, Batagaysky Rural Okrug
 Khomustakh, Legyoysky Rural Okrug
 Khonogor
 Kylayy
 Mayagas
 Myndaba
 Ogorodtakh
 Okoyemovka
 Sasylykan
 Stoyka
 Syrdakh
 Tanda
 Tit-Ary
 Tomtor
 Tuluna
 Tumul
 Us-Kyuyol
 Usun-Kyuyol

Ust-Maysky District  
Rural localities in Ust-Maysky District:

 8-y km
 Belkachi
 Ezhantsy
 Kyuptsy
 Petropavlovsk
 Troitsk
 Tumul
 Ust-Mil
 Ust-Ynykchan
 Ust-Yudoma

Ust-Yansky District  
Rural localities in Ust-Yansky District:

 Khayyr
 Sayylyk
 Tumat
 Ust-Yansk
 Uyandi
 Yukagir

Verkhnekolymsky District 
Rural localities in Verkhnekolymsky District:

 Nelemnoye
 Ugolnoye
 Usun-Kyuyol
 Utaya
 Verkhnekolymsk

Verkhnevilyuysky District 
Rural localities in Verkhnevilyuysky District:

 Andreyevsky
 Bagadya
 Balagannakh
 Botulu
 Bychchagdan
 Byrakan
 Byuteydyakh
 Chengere
 Dalyr
 Dyullyukyu
 Keng-Kyuyol
 Kharbala
 Kharyyalakh
 Khomustakh, Khomustakhsky Rural Okrug
 Khomustakh, Namsky Rural Okrug
 Khoro
 Kudu
 Kulusunnakh
 Kyotyordyokh
 Kyrykyy
 Kyul
 Lippe-Atakh
 May
 Orgyot
 Orosu
 Sayylyk
 Tamalakan
 Tuobuya
 Verkhnevilyuysk

Verkhoyansky District  
Rural localities in Verkhoyansky District:

 Alysardakh
 Bala
 Barylas
 Betenkyos
 Boronuk
 Cholbon
 Chyoryumche
 Engya-Sayylyga
 Khayysardakh
 Machakh
 Metyaki
 Osokhtokh
 Saydy
 Sentachan
 Stolby
 Suordakh
 Sysy-Meyite
 Tala
 Tokuma
 Tomtor, Borulakhsky Rural Okrug
 Tomtor, Dulgalakhsky Rural Okrug
 Ulakhan-Kyuyol
 Ust-Charky
 Yunkyur
 Yurdyuk-Kumakh
 Yuttyakh

Vilyuysky District  
Rural localities in Vilyuysky District:

 Arylakh
 Balagachchy
 Betyung
 Chay
 Chineke
 Ebya
 Ilbenge
 Khampa
 Kirovo
 Kyubyainde
 Kyulekyan
 Kyunde
 Lyokyochyon
 Satagay
 Seyat
 Sortol
 Sosnovka
 Starovatovo
 Sydybyl
 Tasagar
 Terbyas
 Tosu
 Tympy
 Usun
 Yekyundyu

Yakutsk City 
Rural localities in Yakutsk city of republic significance:

 Khatassy
 Magan
 Namtsyr
 Staraya Tabaga
 Tabaga

Zhigansky District  
Rural localities in Zhigansky District:

 Bakhanay
 Bestyakh
 Dzhardzhan
 Kystatyam
 Zhigansk

See also
 
 Lists of rural localities in Russia
 Djarkhan

References

Sakha Republic